The Langsdale Plantation, also known as Prairie Place, is a historic plantation in Clarke County, Mississippi, USA. It has been listed on the National Register of Historic Places since May 22, 1980.

References

Houses on the National Register of Historic Places in Mississippi
Houses in Clarke County, Mississippi
Plantations in Mississippi
National Register of Historic Places in Clarke County, Mississippi
Greek Revival houses in Mississippi